Luke Rowe may refer to:

 Luke Rowe (born 1990), Welsh racing cyclist
 Luke Rowe (footballer) (born 1991), New Zealand footballer